Austin Henry Jones (born December 12, 1992) is an American convicted sex offender and former musician who was active as a YouTuber from 2007 to 2017, prior to his arrest for production of child pornography in 2017 and conviction in 2019. In 2015, Jones apologized after a video of him teaching an underage girl to twerk surfaced, with many exposing him and/or calling him out.

After accumulating around 540,000 subscribers and over 20 million video views, Jones became more widely known due to his arrest for sexual misconduct involving minors and his possession and production of child pornography. On February 6, 2019, his YouTube channel was terminated. On May 3, 2019, Jones was sentenced to 10 years in federal prison for receipt of child pornography.

Career
Jones began releasing music in 2007 and started writing his own material in 2010. In 2014, he released an EP titled We'll Fall Together, which ended up at number 12 on the iTunes pop chart. In 2016, Jones released a full-length album titled Pitch Imperfect. Jones also made videos of a cappella covers of songs by various alternative bands, such as My Chemical Romance's "Welcome to the Black Parade", Panic! at the Disco's "I Write Sins Not Tragedies", Fall Out Boy's "Sugar, We're Goin Down" and Twenty One Pilots' entire Blurryface album.

Controversy and incarceration
On May 10, 2015, the music website PupFresh reported that Jones had contacted multiple underage female fans online, each time persuading the girl to twerk on video for him and also giving her directions on how to perform the act while being recorded. A Change.org petition started by an anonymous 15-year-old girl to revoke his planned participation in the upcoming Vans Warped Tour surfacing in light of these events did not accumulate enough signatures, but Jones eventually withdrew from the tour and addressed the allegations in a video he uploaded to his channel, "Setting the Record Straight". He admitted that the allegations were correct and apologized for his actions, while denying that nudity was involved in any of the videos he recorded or any of the webcam conversations.

On June 9, 2017, a United States Magistrate Judge signed a search warrant for Jones' residence in Bloomingdale, Illinois. On June 12, 2017, Homeland Security Investigations executed that search warrant. On the same day, Jones was arrested at O'Hare International Airport by agents of U.S. Immigration and Customs Homeland Security Investigations on two counts of producing child pornography (once in 2016 and once in 2017). Jones consented to a search of his phone and signed a written consent form. HSI transported Jones to its offices to conduct a videotaped interview and Jones signed a written Miranda waiver. In each case he persuaded an underage female fan to make sexually explicit videos of herself, according to his directions. At a June 15 court hearing, Jones was released from federal custody to house arrest in his mother's custody after posting a $100,000 bond, but was ordered to abstain from using the Internet while he awaited trial.

He pleaded guilty to a single count of "receipt of child pornography" on February 1, 2019, and was sentenced to 10 years in federal prison on May 3, 2019. After a court hearing on May 6, 2019, Jones was given permission to remain under house arrest until he reported to prison on June 28, 2019. On May 14, 2019, a YouTube video was released by YouTuber deefizzy citing evidence implicating Kevin Lyman (founder of Vans Warped Tour), Leslie West (owner of The Rave in Wisconsin) and Bryan Stars in covering up Jones' behavior and actions. As of 2022 he was imprisoned at FCI Loretto under register number 52069-424.  His scheduled release date was listed as 2027-12-31.

Discography
Out of Character (2010)
From Under the Covers (2011)
Out of Character 2.0 (2012)
We'll Fall Together (2013)
Pitch Imperfect (2016)

See also
 Mike Lombardo

References

External links
 

1992 births
Living people
21st-century American criminals
American criminals
American male criminals
American male pop singers
American people convicted of child pornography offenses
American prisoners and detainees
American YouTubers
Child abuse incidents and cases
Criminals from Chicago
Criminals from Illinois
Musicians from Illinois
Music YouTubers
People from Bloomingdale, Illinois
People from Chicago
Pop punk musicians
Prisoners and detainees of the United States federal government
Sexual harassment in the United States
YouTube channels launched in 2011
YouTube channels closed in 2019
YouTube controversies